Kathie L. Olsen is an American neuroscientist who is noted for her work in scientific policy. Between August 2005 and January 2009, she was the Deputy Director and Chief Operating Officer of the National Science Foundation, a United States government agency. She serves on the Advisory Board of the Journal of Science Policy & Governance.

Significant publications

Book
 Haug, M, R. Whalen, R.E; Aron, Cl., and Olsen, K (Eds.). The Development of Sex Differences and Similarities in Behaviour. Kluwar Academic Publishers, Dordrecht/Boston/London, 1993.

Book chapters
 Olsen, K.L. and Carlson, A., "Federal Science Policy:  A Perspective from Inside the Beltway" In Defining Values for Research and Technology-The University's Changing Role. Greenough, W.T, McConnaughay, P.  J., and Kesan, J. P.  Rowman & Littlefield Publishers, NY, Champaign-Urbana, 2007.
 Olsen, K.L., "Sex and the Mutant Mouse: Strategies for Understanding the Sexual Differentiation of the Brain," in NATO Advanced Research Workshop: The Development of Sex Differences and Similarities in Behaviour. M. Haug, R. Whalen, Cl. Aron, and K.L. Olsen (Eds.) The Development of Sex Differences and Similarities in Behaviour. Kluwar Academic Publishers, Dordrecht/Boston/London, 1993.
 Olsen, K.L., "Genetic Influences on Sexual Behavior Differentiation," in Sexual Differentiation: A Life-Span Approach, Handbook of Neurobiology. Handbook of Behavioral Neurobiology. A. Gerall, H. Moltz, and I.L. Ward (Eds.) 10, pp. 1–40, Plenum Press, 1992.
 Olsen, K.L., "Aromatization: Is It Critical for Differentiation of Sexually Dimorphic Behaviors?" in Neurobiology, R. Gilles and J. Balthazart (Eds.) Springer-Verlag, Berlin/Heidelberg, pp. 149–164, 1985.
 Olsen, K.L., "Genetic Determinants of Sexual Differentiation," in Hormones and Behavior in Higher Vertebrates, J. Balthazart, E. Prove, and R. Gilles (Eds.) Springer-Verlag, Heidelberg, pp. 138–158, 1983.
 Fox, T.O., Olsen, K.L., Vito, C.C., and Wieland, S.J., "Putative Steroid Receptors: Genetics and Development," in Molecular Genetics and Neurosciences: A New Hybrid, F.O. Schmitt, S.J. Bird, and F.E. Bloom (Eds.), Raven Press, New York, pp. 289–306, 1982.

Significant articles

 Olsen, Kathie. L.; Neysa M. Call; Melissa A. Summers; and Ann B. Carlson. The Evolution of Excellence: Policies, Paradigms, and Practices Shaping U.S. Research and Development.  In China, India, and the United States (Special Issue).  Technology in Society: An International Journal.  Vol. 30, No. 3-4, 2008.

PhD thesis
Hormonal mechanisms controlling the development and regulation of male-female differences, Doctoral thesis, 1979

See also 

National Science Foundation
National Aeronautics and Space Administration (NASA)

References

External links 
Kathie L. Olsen's National Science Foundation Biography
ScienceWorks DC

American neuroscientists
Living people
American women neuroscientists
United States National Science Foundation officials
Year of birth missing (living people)
Chatham University alumni
University of California, Irvine alumni
Harvard Medical School alumni
Cleveland High School (Portland, Oregon) alumni
American chief operating officers
21st-century American women